Prince Kazimierz Nestor Sapieha (1757–1798) was a Polish-Lithuanian noble (szlachcic) and one the creators of the 3 May Constitution.

Biography

Early life and career
Kazimierz Sapieha was educated at the Knight School in Warsaw from 1767 until 1771, and later studied in Italy. Upon his return he served as Artillery General of Lithuania, from 1773 to 1793. As Deputy from Brzesc Litewski, he participated in several Sejms. Most notably, from 1790 he participated in the Four-Year Sejm in Warsaw, and became Sejm Marshal from 6 October 1788 until 29 May 1792, and Marshal of the Lithuanian Confederation.

Politics
An early supporter of the magnate opposition to any liberalization (his uncle Hetman Franciszek Ksawery Branicki was its leader), Sapieha changed his position under the influence of Stanisław Małachowski, and became a supporter of reforms, and the 3 May Constitution. He strongly protested, when King Stanisław August Poniatowski joined the Targowica Confederation, and this so angered Sapieha, that he decided to leave Poland. He briefly settled in Dresden. After the outbreak of the Kościuszko Uprising, he returned to his homeland and participated in the uprising, holding the rank of an Artillery Captain. After the Uprising collapsed, he left Poland again, and spent the rest of his life in exile in Vienna, where he died 1798.

Awards
 Knight of the Order of the White Eagle, awarded on January 1, 1779.

References

1757 births
1798 deaths
People from Brest, Belarus
People from Brest Litovsk Voivodeship
Generals of the Polish–Lithuanian Commonwealth
Kazimierz Nestor
Polish generals
Members of the Great Sejm
Kościuszko insurgents
Signers of the Polish Constitution of May 3, 1791
18th-century Polish–Lithuanian politicians
18th-century Lithuanian nobility
Recipients of the Order of the White Eagle (Poland)